Norman Francis McFarland (February 21, 1922 – April 16, 2010) was an American prelate of the Roman Catholic Church.  He served as the second bishop of the Diocese of Orange in California from 1987 until 1998.  He previously served as an auxiliary bishop of the Archdiocese of San Francisco in California from 1970 to 1976 and as bishop of the new Diocese of Reno-Las Vegas in Nevada from 1976 to 1987.

Biography

Early life 
Norman McFarland was born on February 21, 1922, in Martinez, California, as the third oldest son of Francis and Agnes (Kotchevar) McFarland. He went to public schools and later attended Saint Joseph Seminary in Mountain View, California. McFarland earned his Bachelor of Arts degree in 1943 at Saint Patrick Major Seminary in Menlo Park, California.

McFarland was ordained to the priesthood on June 15, 1946, by Archbishop John J. Mitty for the Archdiocese of San Francisco.In 1946, McFarland was serving as an associate pastor at St. Andrew's Parish in Oakland, California, when he was selected by Archbishop Mitty to attend the Catholic University of America in Washington, D.C. McFarland earned a Doctor of Canon Law degree and returned to the archdiocese. McFarland served in several archdiocesan positions, including as a marriage tribunal official and a professor at Lone Mountain College in Menlo Park, California.

Auxiliary Bishop of San Francisco 
McFarland was appointed by Pope Paul VI as an auxiliary bishop of the Archdiocese of San Francisco and Titular Bishop of Bida on June 5, 1970. He was consecrated on September 5, 1970, by Archbishop Joseph McGucken. His principal co-consecrators were Bishops Hugh Donohoe and Merlin Guilfoyle. McFarland was appointed as the vicar for finance, vicar for seminarians, and pastor in residence at Old Mission Dolores in San Francisco

On December 6, 1974, McFarland was appointed as the apostolic administrator of the Diocese of Reno by Paul VI upon the resignation of Bishop Michael Green. As the administrator, McFarland was in charge of finances for all of Nevada and is credited with covering "its debt by spending eight days on the phone asking bishops around the country for grants and low-interest loans."

Bishop of Reno 
Paul VI appointed McFarland as bishop of the new Diocese of Reno-Las Vegas on February 10, 1976.  McFarland expanded the funding for Catholic Charities.

Bishop of Orange
McFarland was appointed as bishop of the Diocese of Orange by Pope John Paul II on December 29, 1986, after the death of Bishop William Johnson. McFarland was installed as its bishop on February 24, 1987. In 1995, after hearing McFarland's homily at the Red Mass for Orange County, several Orange County Bar Association member lawyers formed the St. Thomas More Society of Orange County.

Retirement and legacy 
Prior to his 76th birthday in 1998, McFarland submitted his resignation which was accepted by Pope John Paul II on June 30, 1998.  In 2003, McFarland was inducted to the Ring of Honor of Mater Dei High School in Santa Ana, California. McFarland was recognized during the annual spring Ring of Honor and Founders Circle Dinner for his contributions towards their community.

Norman McFarland suffered a heart attack and died in Orange, California, on April 16, 2010. His Mass of the Resurrection was held at the Holy Family Cathedral in Orange, California, on April 23, 2010.

Episcopal succession 

McFarland's direct Apostolic succession is delineated from Cardinal Scipione Rebiba. Over 91% of the world's more than 4,000 Catholic bishops alive today trace their episcopal lineage back to Rebiba.

Sources
 The Roman Catholic Diocese of Orange www.rcbo.org Retrieved: 2010-04-20.
 The Most Reverend Norman Francis McFarland, D.D., J.C.D. www.rcbo.org Retrieved: 2010-04-20.

References

1922 births
2010 deaths
Saint Patrick's Seminary and University alumni
Catholic University of America alumni
Roman Catholic bishops of Reno-Las Vegas
20th-century Roman Catholic bishops in the United States
21st-century Roman Catholic bishops in the United States
People from Martinez, California
University of San Francisco alumni
Catholics from California